is a Japanese mathematician, known for his work in algebraic geometry, particularly in relation to the classification of three-folds.

Career
Mori completed his Ph.D. titled "The Endomorphism Rings of Some Abelian Varieties" under Masayoshi Nagata at Kyoto University in 1978. He was visiting professor at Harvard University during 1977–1980, the Institute for Advanced Study in 1981–82, Columbia University 1985–87 and the University of Utah for periods during 1987–89 and again during 1991–92. He has been a professor at Kyoto University since 1990.

Work

He generalized the classical approach to the classification of algebraic surfaces to the classification of algebraic three-folds. The classical approach used the concept of minimal models of algebraic surfaces. He found that the concept of minimal models can be applied to three-folds as well if we allow some singularities on them. The extension of Mori's results to dimensions higher than three is called the minimal model program and is an active area of research in algebraic geometry.

He has been elected president of the International Mathematical Union, becoming the first head of the group from East Asia.

Awards
He was awarded the Fields Medal in 1990 at the International Congress of Mathematicians.

In 2021, he received the Order of Culture.

Major publications 

 
 
 
 
 
 Kollár, János; Miyaoka, Yoichi; Mori, Shigefumi. Rationally connected varieties. J. Algebraic Geom. 1 (1992), no. 3, 429–448. 
 
 
 
 Kollár, János; Mori, Shigefumi. Birational geometry of algebraic varieties. With the collaboration of C. H. Clemens and A. Corti. Translated from the 1998 Japanese original. Cambridge Tracts in Mathematics, 134. Cambridge University Press, Cambridge, 1998. viii+254 pp.

See also
Keel–Mori theorem

References

Heisuke Hironaka, The work of Shigefumi Mori. Fields Medallists Lectures, Michael F. Atiyah (Editor), Daniel Iagolnitzer (Editor); World Scientific Publishing, 2007.

External links

1951 births
Living people
20th-century Japanese mathematicians
21st-century Japanese mathematicians
Fields Medalists
Algebraic geometers
People from Nagoya
Kyoto University alumni
Academic staff of Kyoto University
Academic staff of Nagoya University
Foreign Members of the Russian Academy of Sciences
Foreign associates of the National Academy of Sciences
Institute for Advanced Study visiting scholars
Persons of Cultural Merit
Recipients of the Order of Culture
University of Utah faculty
Columbia University faculty
Harvard University faculty
Presidents of the International Mathematical Union